Universal James is the fifty-sixth studio album by American musician James Brown. It was released on March 9, 1993 via Scotti Brothers Records. Recording sessions took place at Soul II Soul Studios in London, UK and at Studio South in Augusta, Georgia. Production was handled by Jazzie B, David Cole, Robert Clivillés, "Sweet" Charles Sherrell, and James Brown himself. It features guest appearances from C+C Music Factory and Leaders of the New School on the album's lead single "Can't Get Any Harder", which peaked at number 59 on the UK Singles Chart. The album itself found a mild success on the Swiss Hitparade, reaching number 34 spot.

Track listing

Charts

References

External links

1993 albums
James Brown albums
Albums produced by James Brown
Scotti Brothers Records albums
Albums produced by David Cole (record producer)